The 1996 Fresno State Bulldogs football team represented California State University, Fresno as a member of the Pacific Division of the Western Athletic Conference (WAC) during the 1996 NCAA Division I-A football season. Led by Jim Sweeney in his 19th and final season as head coach, Fresno State compiled an overall record of 4–7 with a mark of 3–5 in conference play, tying for fifth place in the WAC's Pacific Division. The Bulldogs played their home games at Bulldog Stadium in Fresno, California.

Schedule

Roster

Team players in the NFL
The following were selected in the 1997 NFL Draft.

The following finished their college career in 1996, were not drafted, but played in the NFL.

References

Fresno State
Fresno State Bulldogs football seasons
Fresno State Bulldogs football